Fractal Spectrum is a magazine about role-playing games that was published by Fractal Dimensions Publishing.

Contents
Fractal Spectrum, edited by Donald Redick and Kathleen Seymour, included interviews with game designers, reviews, industry news, and variants of rules for various role-playing games.

Reception
In the October 1997 edition of Dragon (Issue #240), Rick Swan admitted the artwork was "so-so", and the articles were "too-specialized-for-their-own-good". But Swan thought "what puts this periodical on the must-read list is the comprehensive news section. The latest issue (#13) offers close to 125 (!) reports covering every aspect of game-related publishing."

Reviews
Knights of the Dinner Table Magazine #18,  p.83, "Zine Scene"

References

Role-playing game magazines